Charles Oatley Bennett (15 August 1872 – 23 May 1921) played first-class cricket for Somerset in 1902. He was born at Ticehurst, East Sussex and died at Bath, Somerset.

Educated at Haileybury College, Bennett was a right-handed lower-order batsman and a leg-break bowler, though he did not bowl in first-class cricket. He appeared in two matches for Somerset in June 1902, but was not successful, with a highest score of only 6.

References

1872 births
1921 deaths
English cricketers
Somerset cricketers
People from Ticehurst